Brusqeulia bonita is a species of moth of the family Tortricidae. It is found in Bahia, Brazil.

The wingspan is about 11 mm. The ground colour of the forewings is whitish grey with greyish suffusions and some blackish grey strigulae (fine streaks). The hindwings are greyish, but paler basally.

Etymology
The specific name refers to the type locality, Bonito.

References

Moths described in 2011
Brusqeulia
Moths of South America
Taxa named by Józef Razowski